Jeffrey Alan Winkless (June 2, 1941 – June 26, 2006) was an American actor. He was born in Springfield, Massachusetts (U.S.). Two of his younger brothers, Terence H. Winkless and Daniel Owen Winkless, worked with him on The Banana Splits Adventure Hour. He was also credited as Jeffrey Brock. He did voice-overs for several anime titles including Castle in the Sky, Vampire Hunter D, Nadia: The Secret of Blue Water, Wicked City and Lupin the Third. Winkless died of a brain tumor on June 26, 2006 in Evanston, Illinois (U.S.).

Filmography

Anime 

 Honeybee Hutch (1970)
 Babel II (1973) - Yamazaki
 Lupin III: The Mystery of Mamo (1978) - Police commissioner / Boris
 Lupin III: The Castle of Cagliostro (1979) - Interpol Chairman / Jodo (Streamline Dub)
 The New Adventures of Gigantor (1980-1981)
 Space Adventure Cobra: The Movie (1982) - Crystal Boy / Preacher Dakoba
 The Professional: Golgo 13 (1983) - Informant
 Nausicaä of the Valley of the Wind (1984) - Gun Theft Victim ('Warriors of the Wind' dub) (English version, uncredited)
 Megazone 23 Part I (1985) - Brian / Underground Hargan 2 / Team 11 / District 3D / Military Announcement (StreamLine Pictures dub)
 Vampire Hunter D (1985) - Count Magnus Lee
 The Dirty Pair's Affair on Nolandia (1985) - Chief Gooley
 Noozles (1985) - Osgood / Spike
 Megazone 23 Part II (1986) - Guts (International Dub)
 Windaria (1986) - Caleb / Court / Jim
 Castle in the Sky (1986) - Muska (1989 Dub, as Jack Witte)
 Maple Town (1986-1987) - Mr. Beaver
 Wicked City (1987) - Mr. Shadow
 Neo-Tokyo (1987) - Robot 444-1
 Twilight of the Cockroaches (1987) - Civilian / Commandant / Dad / Restauranter / Walla
 Little Women (1987, TV Series)
 Grimm's Fairy Tale Classics (1987-1988, TV Series) - 2nd Little Pig
 Doomed Megalopolis (1988) - Yasanori Kato (Streamline dub)
 Crying Freeman (1988-1999) - Koh Takugen
 Ox Tales - Ollie Ox, additional characters
 Wowser (1989) - Wowser, additional voices
 Dirty Pair: Flight 005 Conspiracy (1990) - Chief Gooley
 The Secret of Blue Water (1990-1991) - Captain Nemo (original dub)
 Silent Mobius (1991) - Lucifer Hawk (original Streamline Pictures dub)
 3x3 Eyes (1991) - Prof. Fuji (Streamline / Manga dub)
 Sangokushi (1992) - Kung / Chien / Dad / Assassin
 Crimson Wolf (1993)
 8 Man After (1993) - Tony Gleck
 Casshan: Robot Hunter (1993) - Android BK-01 (Black King)
 Gatchaman (1994) - President Beolute
 Jin Jin and the Panda Patrol (1994)
 DNA Sights 999.9 (1998) - Trader Doctor

Animation 
 The Dragon That Wasn't (Or Was He?) (1983) - Chief of Police Snooper, Bul Super, Marquis de Canteclaer (English version)
 The Stabilizer (1986) - Greg Rainmaker (English version)
 Wisdom of the Gnomes (1987-1988)
 Captain of the Forest (1988) - Zero / Eddie (English version)
 Aladdin and the Adventure of All Time (2000)

Live-action 
 The Banana Splits (1968-1970, TV Series) - Fleegle
 Soylent Green (1973) - receptionist for Edward G.Robinson at suicide facility (Soylent factory) (uncredited)
 Gone in 60 Seconds (1974) - Firebird Car Cleaner (uncredited)
 Hallo Spencer (1979, TV Series) - Spencer (voice)
 Free Ride (1986) - Waiter
 The Nest (1988) - Church
 Saturday the 14th Strikes Back (1988) - John Wilkes Booth
 Spaced Invaders (1990) - Captain Bipto (voice)
 Corporate Affairs (1990) - Businessman
 Zeiram (1991) - Bob / Storeowner
 Rage and Honor (1992) - Farmer
 Look Who's Talking Now (1993) - Dogs / Wolves (voice)
 Scene of the Crime (1996) - Len Mirkin
 Black Scorpion (2001, TV Series) - Auctioneer (final appearance)

Video games 
 The Space Adventure (1991) - Crystal Boy
 Star Trek: 25th Anniversary Enhanced (1992) - Quetzelcotal
 Might and Magic: World of Xeen (1994)
 Inherit the Earth: Quest for the Orb (1994)
 Stonekeep (1995) - Scourge / Whispering Voice

References

External links
 
 
 Jeff Winkless | CrystalAcids.com
 

1941 births
2006 deaths
20th-century American male actors
20th-century American male musicians
20th-century American composers
Actors from Springfield, Massachusetts
American male composers
American male film actors
American male voice actors
American television writers
Deaths from brain tumor
Ithaca College alumni
American male television writers
Musicians from Springfield, Massachusetts
Screenwriters from Massachusetts
Writers from Springfield, Massachusetts
20th-century American screenwriters
20th-century American male writers